Viljami Kari Veikko Sinisalo (born 11 October 2001) is a Finnish footballer who plays as a goalkeeper for  club Aston Villa and the Finland national team. Sinisalo previously played for FC Espoo in the Finnish Kakkonen (third tier), making his league debut aged only fifteen, and has appeared regularly at youth international level for Finland before debuting for the senior team.

Club career
Sinisalo spent his youth career with Hyvinkään Palloseura, HJK and FC Honka, and made his senior league debut for FC Espoo in June 2017, aged only 15.

He joined Aston Villa's academy in 2018, and was a regular player in their under-18 and under-23 sides before joining Ayr United in the Scottish Championship on loan until the end of the season on 25 September 2020. He made his Ayr United debut on 6 October 2020, in a 5–2 away Scottish League Cup victory over Albion Rovers. On 8 April 2021, Sinisalo's loan was cut short, after he suffered a groin injury and returned to Aston Villa.

On 6 July 2021, Sinisalo was amongst several Academy players who were given new professional contracts. One year on, on 6 July 2022, Sinisalo renewed his Aston Villa contract once again.

On 11 July 2022, Sinisalo signed for League One club Burton Albion on a season-long loan. He made his debut on 9 August 2022, in a 2–0 EFL Cup defeat to Rochdale. The loan was ended early and Sinisalo returned to Villa on 1 January 2023.

International career
Sinisalo has played for Finland at under-17 and under-19 levels. On 17 November 2020, he made his debut for the Under-21s in a UEFA European Under-21 Championship qualifier against Malta. Sinisalo was named Finland U21's captain for their 15 November 2021 UEFA European Under-21 Championship qualifier against Estonia.

On 14 September 2022, Sinisalo was selected for the Finland senior squad for the first time, for their upcoming UEFA Nations League matches against Romania and Montenegro. Sinisalo was an unused substitute in both games.

In December 2022, Sinisalo was named U21 Player of the Year for 2022.

On 12 January 2023, Sinisalo made his debut for the senior Finland national football team in a 1–0 friendly defeat to Estonia.

Career statistics

International

References

External links

2001 births
Living people
Finnish footballers
Association football goalkeepers
FC Espoo players
Aston Villa F.C. players
Ayr United F.C. players
Burton Albion F.C. players
Kakkonen players
Scottish Professional Football League players
Finland youth international footballers
Finnish expatriate footballers
Expatriate footballers in England
Expatriate footballers in Scotland
Finnish expatriate sportspeople in England
Finnish expatriate sportspeople in Scotland
Footballers from Espoo
English Football League players

Finland international footballers